Lawrence Crawford may refer to:
 Lawrence Crawford (soldier)
 Lawrence Crawford (mathematician)
 Lawrence D. Crawford, American mayor of Saginaw, Michigan